The Moti Masjid is a 17th-century congregational mosque located within the Agra Fort UNESCO World Heritage Site. Built by Mughal Emperor Shah Jahan, the mosque is made entirely of white marble.

History 

The Agra Fort's modern appearance is largely owed to Shah Jahan, who dismantled several structures within the Agra Fort to add his own in marble. The Moti Masjid was one such structure. The mosque was constructed in the period 1646-1653, which was notably later than all of his other Agra Fort contributions (these were commenced in 1627, his first regnal year, and completed in 1638). The mosque's completion in 1653 was five years after the Mughal residence had shifted to Shahjahanabad. When Shah Jahan visited the mosque upon its completion, he was so impressed with the structure that he returned two years later to show two of his sons.

Architecture
The mosque complex, built on a high plinth, is a walled enclosure situated to the north of the fort's courtyard. It lies on an east-west axis, and faces the Yamuna river. The outside of the walls is clad in red sandstone, while the inside bears marble.  A high entryway is situated in the centre of each wall; the eastern one serves as the main entrance.

Inside the enclosure walls is a nearly-square courtyard, lined by arcades on the north, south, and eastern edges. An ablution pool lies in the centre of the courtyard. 

On the western edge lies the main prayer hall itself, a multi-bayed aisle structure supported by twelve-sided piers. The façade of the hall bears seven entryways, while the roof features three domes and several chhatri. The front of the hall is shaded by a deep chhajja (eave), under which are Persian inscriptions in black marble. The inscriptions employ complex imagery to glorify Shah Jahan and the Moti Masjid. The interior of the prayer hall does not bear much decoration; Asher notes that the use of undecorated marble is typical of Shah Jahan's private religious architecture.

The Moti Masjid displays much influence from an earlier marble congregational mosque, constructed by Shah Jahan at the Ajmer Sharif Dargah.

Gallery

See also
Mina Masjid
Nagina Masjid

References

External links

Ols Drawings of Moti Masjid

Agra Fort
Mosques in Agra
Grand mosques
Marble buildings
Mosques completed in 1653
Mughal mosques